The Uninvited is a 2009 American psychological horror film directed by the Guard Brothers and starring Emily Browning, Elizabeth Banks, Arielle Kebbel, and David Strathairn. It is a remake of the 2003 South Korean horror film A Tale of Two Sisters, which is in turn one of several film adaptations of the Korean folk tale Janghwa Hongryeon jeon. The film received mixed reviews.

Plot
Following a suicide attempt after her terminally ill mother died in a house fire, Anna Ivers is discharged from a psychiatric institution after ten months; she has no memory of the actual fire, though recurring nightmares from that night frequently plague her. Back at home, Anna reunites with her older sister Alex and comes to learn their father Steven has a new girlfriend, Rachel Summers, who had been their mother's live-in nurse.

Anna and Alex become convinced that Anna's nightmares are messages from their mother, telling them that Rachel murdered her so that she could be with Steven. The girls remain angry at Steven for moving their mother into the boathouse when she got sick, her only way of calling for help being a bell that Rachel tied to her wrist. Anna meets up with her old boyfriend Matt, who tells her he saw what happened the night her mother died, but Rachel intervenes before he can explain further.

Anna goes with Rachel into town, so Alex can look through Rachel’s possessions, and Anna can talk to Matt again. The two secretly plan to meet that night but Matt fails to show up. Anna has a ghastly hallucination of him and, the next morning, his dead body is pulled out of the water, his back broken. The police state he fell from his boat and drowned.

After the sisters are unable to find a record of Rachel with the State Nursing Association, they conclude she is actually Mildred Kemp, a nanny who killed the children she was taking care of after she became obsessed with their widowed father. While Steven is away on business, the girls try to gather evidence against Rachel to show the police, but Rachel catches them and sedates Alex. Anna escapes and goes to the local police station, but they do not believe her and eventually call Rachel to take her home.

Rachel sedates Anna and puts her to bed; Anna sees Alex in the doorway with a knife before passing out. When she wakes up, she finds that Alex has killed Rachel and thrown her body in a dumpster in their backyard. When Steven arrives home, Anna explains that Rachel tried to murder them and Alex saved them. Confused and panicked, Steven asks what Anna is talking about: Alex had died in the fire along with their mother. Anna looks down to find that the bloody knife is in her hand. She then finally remembers what happened on the night of the fire: after catching Steven and Rachel having sex, she became enraged, filled a watering can from a gasoline tank in the boathouse, and carried it toward the house, intending to burn it down. However, she did not fully close the faucet and it spilt a trail of gasoline that ignited when a lantern fell. Her mother was killed in the resulting explosion, as was Alex.

Flashbacks reveal that Anna had been hallucinating Alex since she left the institution, which is why no one else had ever responded to Alex's dialogues. She also remembers killing Matt, who showed up at their planned meeting by letting him fall off a cliff and break his back because he revealed that he saw what Anna had done. She finally remembers killing Rachel, who was not actually a murderer but a kind woman trying to make the family work; she had sedated Anna to try and keep her safe.

The next morning as Anna is arrested for murder, the police question Steven, who reveals that Rachel changed her last name three years ago to escape an abusive ex-boyfriend, which her real name was Rachel Worshinsky. When Anna returns to the mental institution, she is welcomed back by the patient who lives in the room across from hers, whose nameplate reveals she is the real Mildred Kemp.

Cast
 Emily Browning as Anna Ivers
 Elizabeth Banks as Rachel Summers
 Arielle Kebbel as Alex Ivers
 David Strathairn as Steven Ivers
 Jesse Moss as Matt
 Kevin McNulty as Sheriff Emery
 Don S. Davis as Mr. Henson
 Heather Doerksen as Mildred Kemp
 Maya Massar as Mom
 Lex Burnham as Iris Wright
 Danny Bristol as Samuel Wright
 Matthew Bristol as David Wright
 Dean Paul Gibson as Dr. Silberling

Development
In 2002, producers Walter F. Parkes and Laurie MacDonald produced the hit horror film The Ring, a remake of the Japanese film Ring. They subsequently produced the film's successful sequel The Ring Two in 2005. Since first starting this new cycle of Asian horror film adaptations, Parkes and MacDonald searched for a project they felt was as ingeniously conceived and executed as The Ring and finally found it when producer Roy Lee brought the Korean film A Tale of Two Sisters to their attention.

When A Tale of Two Sisters played in US theatres, directors Tom and Charlie Guard acquired the English language remake rights. The Guard Brothers had previously directed commercials and short films and wanted to expand into feature films.

In June 2006, DreamWorks announced that a deal had been set up for the US version of A Tale of Two Sisters. The new film was a presentation of DreamWorks and Cold Spring Pictures (Disturbia) and was produced by Parkes, MacDonald and Lee. The screenplay was written by Craig Rosenberg (After the Sunset, Lost), Doug Miro and Carlo Bernard (The Great Raid).

In early 2008, the film, whose working title had been A Tale of Two Sisters, was renamed to The Uninvited.

The film was released in North American theatres on 30 January 2009.

Shooting location
Although the film is set in Maine, it was shot in Vancouver, British Columbia. Most of the film was shot at one location, a waterfront property on British Columbia's Bowen Island, a short ferry ride west from mainland Vancouver.

Producer Walter F. Parkes said, of the shooting location:

It is reported that a two-storey boathouse in the film was built on the property overlooking the water just for several scenes. The cold water is rough and unappealing; it is a greenish-grey that crashes constantly and does not invite swimming.

Casting
Emily Browning was hired to portray the lead Anna Ivers. She had originally auditioned for the role of Alex. The film is rated PG-13 and is visually less gory and bloody than the original film. Elizabeth Banks plays the role of the stepmother, Rachel. Banks based her character Rachel on Rebecca De Mornay in The Hand That Rocks the Cradle. "It was very important to me that every line reading I gave could be interpreted two ways," says Banks of her role, "so that when you go back through the movie you can see that." David Strathairn plays the concerned father of the two girls. Arielle Kebbel plays Anna's older sister, Alex Ivers.

Music

The original score for the film was composed by Christopher Young, who recorded it with a 78-piece orchestra and 20-person choir. His score features a glass harmonica and the Yale Women's Slavic Chorus.

Sara Niemietz is the vocalist for the soundtrack and film score, after having previously working with Christopher Young in the same capacity on The Exorcism of Emily Rose (2005).  Now an adult, she is an independent artist and cast-member of Postmodern Jukebox.

Reception

Box office 
On its opening day, the film grossed $4,335,000 and ranked #2 in the box office.
It got $10,512,000 for its opening weekend, set on the third place, opened in 2,344 theaters with an average $4,485 per theatre.
The film spent nine weeks in US cinemas, and finished with a total gross of $28,596,818. It did fairly moderately for a horror film in the US markets.
The film was released on March 26, 2009, in Australia, and it opened at the fifth position, averaging $3,998 at 121 sites, for a gross of A$483,714. The second week it dipped 29%.

Critical response 
On Rotten Tomatoes the film has an approval rating of 32% based on reviews from 129 critics, with an average rating of 4.55/10. The site's critics consensus reads, "The Uninvited is moody and reasonably involving but suffers from predictable plot twists." On Metacritic it has a weighted average score of 43 out of 100 based on 24 reviews, which indicates "mixed or average" reception. In Yahoo! Movies Critical Response, the average professional critical rating was a C according to 11 reviews.  Audiences surveyed by CinemaScore gave the film a grade B on scale of A to F.

Dennis Harvey of Variety wrote: "Weak even by the standard of uninspired recent Asian-horror remakes, The Uninvited is more likely to induce snickers and yawns than shudders and yelps." Kim Newman of Empire magazine gave it 2 out of 5 and called it a "slick remake.... with a new set of twists" but let down by a finale featuring "revelations you've seen far too often" and an underused role for Banks. Bloody Disgusting gave the film 3 out of 5 and noted Banks and Kebbel's fine performances but also criticised the ending, "which can be figured out within the first 20 minutes" and noting it as "perfectly acceptable as a major-studio horror film for the 13 – 17 crowd and is unlikely to insult or ruffle the feathers of any genre fan that wants to give it a go."

Roger Ebert gave it 3 out of 4, with particular praise for Browning: "She makes an ideal heroine for a horror movie: innocent, troubled, haunted by nightmares, persecuted by a wicked stepmother, convinced her real mother was deliberately burned to death. She makes you fear for her, and that's half the battle." Ebert also had positive notes for the cinematography, the casting of Strathairn. He expressed surprise at the PG-13 rating and cited this film as evidence that MPAA rates films based on the absence of sex, nudity, or foul language, rather than the imagery it does contain that might actually be inappropriate for younger viewers.
Claudia Puig of USA Today gave it a positive review and wrote: "Don't be too quick to turn down The Uninvited. A stylish horror thriller in the vein of "The Ring," it's well-acted, frightening, and handsomely produced."

References

External links
 
 
 
 

2009 films
2009 horror films
American serial killer films
2000s thriller films
2000s psychological horror films
American supernatural horror films
American mystery thriller films
Fratricide in fiction
Sororicide in fiction
Patricide in fiction
Films about fratricide and sororicide
Canadian horror thriller films
Canadian supernatural horror films
German horror films
German thriller films
Films scored by Christopher Young
Films set in Maine
American remakes of South Korean films
Horror film remakes
Films shot in Vancouver
DreamWorks Pictures films
Paramount Pictures films
The Montecito Picture Company films
Films produced by Roy Lee
Films about dissociative identity disorder
2009 directorial debut films
Films produced by Walter F. Parkes
Vertigo Entertainment films
Films based on fairy tales
2000s English-language films
2000s American films
2000s Canadian films
2000s German films